The 2003 regular session of the 147th General Assembly of the U.S. state of Georgia met from January 13, 2003, at 10:00 am, to Friday, April 25, at midnight, at which time both houses adjourned sine die.  Control of the General Assembly was split between the Republican-controlled Senate and the Democratic-controlled House.

This was the longest legislative session in more than a century.  122 general House bills, 174 local House bills, 77 general Senate bills and 41 local Senate bills passed both chambers of the legislature and were sent to the governor for his signature.

The 2004 regular session of the Georgia General Assembly opened at 10:00 am on Monday, January 12, 2004, and adjourned sine die at midnight on Wednesday, April 7, 2004.  The legislature passed 138 general House bills, 160 local House bills, 71 general Senate bills and 25 local Senate bills, which were sent to the governor for his signature.

In addition, Governor Sonny Perdue called for a special session, which met from May 3, 2004, to May 7, 2004, in order to handle the unbalanced budget that had been passed at the end of the regular session.

Officers

Senate

Presiding Officer

Majority leadership

Minority leadership

House of Representatives

Presiding Officer

Majority leadership

Minority Leadership

Members of the Georgia State Senate, 2003–2004

Members of the Georgia State House of Representatives, 2003–2004

References

Georgia General Assembly 2003-2004 Legislative Session
2003-2004 House of Representatives
2003-2004 Senate

Georgia (U.S. state) legislative sessions
2003 in American politics
2004 in American politics
2003 in Georgia (U.S. state)
2004 in Georgia (U.S. state)